Michael Finlay Parkhurst (born January 24, 1984) is an American former soccer player who played as a defender. The 2005 MLS Rookie of the Year and 2007 MLS Defender of the Year Award, Parkhurst was capable of playing both as a center back and right back. He played for the United States national team, including being a member of three CONCACAF Gold Cup squads and participating in the 2008 Summer Olympics.

Youth and college
Born in Providence, Rhode Island, Parkhurst attended the Bradenton Soccer Academy in Florida. He played college soccer at Wake Forest University for the Demon Deacons from 2002 to 2004, where he started all sixty-two games the team played during his tenure, scoring one goal and registering two assists. Parkhurst was named a second-team All-American as a sophomore and junior and graduated from the university with a degree in history. He then signed a Generation adidas contract with MLS following the 2004 season.

Professional career

New England Revolution
Parkhurst, who grew up in Rhode Island and played for CLCF Soccer and Bayside United, was in attendance at the inaugural home game for the New England Revolution, in 1996. Nine years later, on January 14, 2005, he was selected ninth overall in the 2005 MLS SuperDraft by his hometown Revolution. He was ever-present for the Revs in his first season and was named MLS Rookie of the Year.

He scored his first career MLS goal on October 20, 2007, in a 2–2 draw between the Revolution and Toronto FC. The goal was scored from sixty yards out, having caught Toronto's keeper Kenny Stamatopoulos off-guard.

Parkhurst won the MLS Defender of the Year Award in 2007, the MLS Fair Play Award in 2007 and 2008 and was also twice named the MLS Humanitarian of the Year in 2006 and 2008.

F.C. Nordsjælland
After his contract with the Revolution expired after the 2008 season, Parkhurst signed a three-year contract with Danish Superliga side Nordsjælland on December 9, 2008, as a free agent. March 1, 2009, Parkhurst made his FCN league debut in a 1–1 away draw against Vejle.

2009–10 season, with the arrival of Andreas Bjelland and injury to Henrik Kildentoft, Parkhurst was inserted into a variety of new positions, including full back and center midfielder, becoming adept at playing at right back. Parkhurst would help the Wild Tigers to win the Danish Cup, the club's first silverware in their history, and his first trophy in Denmark.

The following season, Parkhurst was hampered by numerous injury setbacks throughout the campaign, eventually losing his place to Jores Okore. He would make his return in time for Nordsjælland's Danish Cup final, winning the cup with a 3–2 victory over F.C. Midtjylland, lifting the trophy for the second consecutive year.

With less than a year remaining on his contract, there was speculation on Michael Parkhurst's future at FCN at the start of the 2011–12 season, with the emergence of Bjelland and Okore's partnership in central defense, Parkhurst was forced to play out of position, often at right back. Helping the club to their best ever start to a season, ending the winter break in December 2011 at a club record second in the league, Parkhurst put rumors to rest when he signed a one-year contract extension with F.C. Nordsjælland, despite financially better offers from other clubs. Michael Parkhust later this season helped F.C. Nordsjælland win the Danish Superliga for the first time in club history, securing the team automatic qualification for 2012–13 season's Champions League group stage.

Parkhurst featured in every minute of Nordsjælland's 2012-2013 UEFA Champions League campaign against Shakhtar Donetsk, Chelsea, and Juventus.

Augsburg
On December 19, 2012, it was announced that Parkhurst joined FC Augsburg on a free transfer. The struggling Bundesliga side finished 15th for the 2012–13 season. He played his first competitive match in Germany on February 10, 2013 – a 1–1 draw at home against 1. FSV Mainz 05.

Columbus Crew SC
The MLS rights to Parkhurst were traded by New England to Columbus Crew SC on January 12, 2014, in exchange for the Crew’s first-round selection in the 2014 MLS SuperDraft and allocation money. Parkhurst made 33 appearances in his first season with Columbus and was named captain of the club. In summer 2014, Parkhurst became the first Columbus player in four years named to the MLS All-Star Team.

Atlanta United FC

On December 11, 2016 Parkhurst was traded to Atlanta United FC in exchange for General Allocation Money.

Parkhurst captained Atlanta to their first MLS Cup victory in 2018, which broke his personal cup drought after four previous finals. 

On September 23, 2019, Parkhurst announced his intention to retire as a professional player at the end of the 2019 season.

International career
Parkhurst is an Irish-American and thus holds an Irish passport. He had declared that he would be willing to play for the Irish national team if his American ambitions never came to fruition. Parkhurst was called up by the United States national team for the 2007 Gold Cup, and the 2013 Gold Cup. He earned his first cap against Trinidad and Tobago on June 9, 2007, thus eliminating any further possibility of playing for the Republic of Ireland. He's been included in many friendlies for the U.S. under Jürgen Klinsmann. He was included on Klinsmann's 30-man preliminary roster for the 2014 FIFA World Cup.

Career statistics

Club

International

Honors

Club
New England Revolution
 Eastern Conference (regular season): 2005
 Runner-up: 2006, 2007
 Eastern Conference (playoffs): 2005, 2006, 2007
 Lamar Hunt U.S. Open Cup: 2007

F.C. Nordsjælland
 Danish Superliga: 2011–12
 Danish Cup: 2009–10, 2010–11

Columbus Crew
 Eastern Conference (regular season) runner-up: 2015
 Eastern Conference (playoffs): 2015

Atlanta United
 MLS Cup: 2018
 Campeones Cup: 2019
 Lamar Hunt U.S. Open Cup: 2019

International
United States
 CONCACAF Gold Cup (2): 2007, 2013

Individual
 MLS Rookie of the Year: 2005
 MLS Fair Play Award (3): 2007, 2008, 2014
 MLS Humanitarian of the Year: 2006
 MLS Defender of the Year: 2007
 MLS Best XI: 2007
 MLS All-Star Team (6): 2005, 2007, 2008, 2014, 2017, 2018

References

External links
 
 

Living people
1984 births
Sportspeople from Providence, Rhode Island
Association football defenders
American soccer players
United States men's under-23 international soccer players
United States men's international soccer players
Olympic soccer players of the United States
IMG Academy Bradenton players
Wake Forest Demon Deacons men's soccer players
New England Revolution players
FC Nordsjælland players
FC Augsburg players
Columbus Crew players
Atlanta United FC players
USL League Two players
Major League Soccer players
Major League Soccer All-Stars
Danish Superliga players
Bundesliga players
CONCACAF Gold Cup-winning players
2007 CONCACAF Gold Cup players
Footballers at the 2008 Summer Olympics
2009 CONCACAF Gold Cup players
2013 CONCACAF Gold Cup players
American expatriate soccer players
American expatriate soccer players in Germany
Expatriate men's footballers in Denmark
New England Revolution draft picks
Soccer players from Rhode Island